Judo at the 2014 Asian Games was held at the Dowon Gymnasium in Incheon, South Korea between 20 and 23 September 2014.

Schedule

Medalists

Men

Women

Medal table

Participating nations 
A total of 218 athletes from 33 nations competed in judo at the 2014 Asian Games:

References

External links
 Official website
 

 
2014 Asian Games events
2014
Asian Games
Asian Games